Nicolette Daisy Milnes-Walker, MBE (1943-) was the first woman to sail non-stop single-handed across the Atlantic. She set sail on 12 June 1971 from Milford Haven, UK and arrived in Newport USA forty five days later on 26 July. She made her crossing in a 30 ft yacht, Aziz, a 'Pioneer' Class 9 meter designed by Van Der Stadt and constructed by Southern Ocean Shipyard Ltd, Poole, Dorset.

Miss Milnes-Walker returned from the USA to the UK on board the Cunard passenger liner Queen Elizabeth 2, arriving in Southampton on 11 August 1971. Upon her arrival, Sir Robin Knox-Johnston presented her with a painting of Aziz on behalf of the builders.

References

1943 births
British sailors
Living people